is a city in Shimane Prefecture, Japan. Izumo is known for  noodles and the Izumo-taisha Shinto shrine.

History
Izumo Taisha is the oldest Shinto shrine in Japan. In 2008, the holy area was open to the public from 1 August until August 17, after which extensive renovation work began. The nearby Shimane Museum of Ancient Izumo, also located in Taisha Machi, has artifacts from the site.

In 2009, a team of archaeologists announced that they likely discovered—at the Sunabara Remains in Taki-chō, Izumo City—the oldest stone tools ever found in Japan. The find totaled about 20 tools dating back an estimated 120,000 years: about 80,000 years earlier than previous estimates of when the first humans arrived in the Japanese archipelago. The stones were found directly across Route 9 from Kirara Taki beach on the Sea of Japan. The excavation team was led by Doshisha University professor Kazuto Matsufuji, and the first of the tools were unearthed by Toshiro Naruse, a professor emeritus at Hyogo University of Teacher Education.

In Izumo, there are various tombs and temples, including an ancient cluster of tombs to the south of the station. Within this tomb cluster is located the largest Tumulus style tomb within the Izumo region. With an overall length of 100 metres and mound 6 metres in height, the tomb located behind the Dainenji Temple is believed to have been constructed in the 6th century with highly sophisticated construction methods for the time.

The Takase River is a canal that runs through the center of Izumo. Beginning at the Hiikawa River, the canal runs directly across the town. Constructed by developer Okaji Shichibei in 1670, the Takase was the first canal ever constructed in the then-Matsue domain. Before Okaji began his agricultural developments, the Izumo area was infertile and unable to support crops. Thanks to Okaji's developments, the area became an important region for the growing of rice and grain in the Matsue area.

Izumo Dome is a venue located just north of the city proper. It has the distinction of being Japan's largest wooden building, at 49 metres high and 143 metres in diameter. It is used for sports and events such as baseball games and soccer matches, as well as for other events including sumo. It is a prominent symbol of Izumo, and can be seen from a distance from the train passing towards Hamada.

 is a modern stone lighthouse with a powerful lamp. From the tower, one can see the Oki Islands, from where the story of the "white rabbit" comes.

Shimane Winery is known for its super-sweet wines.

The beach has clean water and off-shore stacks of concrete tetrapods to break the waves. Nearby is an onsen called Marine Thalasso Izumo.

The Okuizumo Museum of Tatara and Sword-making features demonstrations twice a month, switching off every two weeks: one demonstration shows smithing techniques, while the other is a usage demonstration.

The Izumo Handicraft Museum is set in a traditional Japanese workshop complex.

Geography

Climate
Izumo has a humid subtropical climate (Köppen climate classification Cfa) with very warm summers and cool winters. Precipitation is abundant throughout the year.

Demographics
The modern city was founded on November 3, 1941. As of 2017, the total population is 172,039 and the area of the new city of Izumo is 624.36 km².

On March 22, 2005, Izumo absorbed the city of Hirata, and the towns of Koryō, Sada, Taisha and Taki (all from Hikawa District) to create the new and expanded city of Izumo.

On October 1, 2011, the town of Hikawa (also from Hikawa District) was also merged into the new Izumo. Hikawa District was dissolved as a result of this merger.

Transportation

Izumo is serviced by two rail networks. The first is the JR West Sanin Main Line, connecting Izumo-shi Station to Tottori through Yonago and Matsue to the east, and connecting along the coast to Ōda, Hamada and Masuda to the west. The secondary rail network is the private Ichibata Electric Railway. Dentetsu Izumo-shi Station is the terminal, and the line runs from Izumo to Matsue, passing through and connecting Hirata. The Dentetsu line also branches out and runs to Izumo Taisha from Kawato Station. A JR West service to Taisha ran until 1990 when the line was closed and Izumo-Takamatsu and Arakaya stations removed. Taisha JR railway station still exists as a historic building.

There is one airport inside the city of Izumo, Izumo Airport, located in the former town of Hikawa.

International relations
Izumo has a town twinning relationship with the following cities.
  Santa Clara, California, USA (1986)
  Hanzhong, China (1996)
  Évian-les-Bains, France (2002)
  Kalajoki, Finland (2003)
  Dún Laoghaire, Ireland (2008)

See also
Mergers and dissolutions in Shimane
Municipal mergers and dissolutions in Japan
Tetsundo Iwakuni

References

External links

 

Cities in Shimane Prefecture